Local Kung Fu 2 is an Indian Assamese language Kung fu comedy film. It is directed by Kenny Deori Basumatary and produced by Durlov Baruah. It is the sequel to 2013 film Local Kung Fu. The film is based on William Shakespeare's The Comedy of Errors. The film-makers successfully raised money for post-production through crowdfunding and the film was released on April 19, 2017.

Cast
Kenny Deori Basumatary as Deep/Deepu
Utkal Hazowary as Arun/Mohan
Sarmistha Chakravorty as Adriana
Eepsita Hazarika as Lucy
Bonny Deori as Biku
Tony Deori Basumatary as Bob
Bibhuti Bhushan Hazarika as GK
Yashraj Jadhav as Pankhi Baba
Montu Deori as Bhagin
Amar Singh Deori as Mama
Suneet Bora as Rahul
Mrigendra Konwar as Mr. Possessive

Synopsis
The film is an action adaptation of William Shakespeare's Comedy of Errors with a twist. One pair of twins, which grew up in Guwahati, knows fighting, while the other pair, which grew up in Tezpur, doesn't.

Sound Track 
This movie has 7 songs playing in the background of the movie.

Song                     Playback Singer

 Kung Fu You: Tony DB
 Jote Tote:        Ambar Das
 Pi:                    Manu and Chow
 His name is G.K.: Bonny Deori
 Kheli Meli Mon:  Anisha Saikia
 Maya Bhora Jibon: Utkol Hazowary
 Boroxa:             Utkol Hazowary

Sequel
Kenny told reporter of possible release of Local Kung Fu 3 by winter of 2023.

References

External links
 

2010s Assamese-language films
Films based on The Comedy of Errors
Indian films based on plays